Ippolito Andreassi, O.S.B. (1581–1646) was a Roman Catholic prelate who served as Bishop of Terni (1639–1646).

Biography
Ippolito Andreassi was born in Mantua, Italy in 1581 and ordained a priest in the Order of Saint Benedict.
On 11 April 1639, he was appointed during the papacy of Pope Urban VIII as Bishop of Terni.
On 27 April 1639, he was consecrated bishop by Alessandro Cesarini (iuniore), Cardinal-Deacon of Sant'Eustachio, with Tommaso Carafa, Bishop Emeritus of Vulturara e Montecorvino, and Lorenzo della Robbia, Bishop of Fiesole, serving as co-consecrators. 
He served as Bishop of Terni until his death in October 1646.

References

External links and additional sources
 (for Chronology of Bishops) 
 (for Chronology of Bishops) 

17th-century Italian Roman Catholic bishops
Bishops appointed by Pope Urban VIII
1581 births
1646 deaths
Benedictine bishops